{{Infobox musical
|name= Shenandoah
|subtitle=
|image= Shenandoah (musical).jpg
|caption= Original Cast Recording
|music= Gary Geld
|lyrics= Peter Udell
|book= Peter Udell Philip Rose  James Lee Barrett
|basis= 1965 film Shenandoah
|productions= 1974 Goodspeed Opera House  1975 Broadway  1989 Broadway revival

|awards= Tony Award for Best Book in a Musical  Tony Award for Best Actor in a Musical (John Cullum)
}}Shenandoah is a musical that was composed during 1974 with music by Gary Geld, lyrics by Peter Udell, and book by Udell, Philip Rose, and James Lee Barrett. The musical is based on Barrett's original screenplay for the 1965 film Shenandoah.

 Plot 
Charlie Anderson, a widower, lives with his large family in the Shenandoah Valley in Virginia, during the American Civil War.  Anderson does not wish to be involved with the war because he doesn't consider it "his" war, but he is forced to take action when his youngest son Robert is taken prisoner by Union soldiers. In the course of searching for Robert, Charlie, his daughter Jenny, and some of his sons rescue Sam (Jenny's newlywed Confederate soldier husband) from a Yankee POW train. After enduring the tragedy of losing his eldest son Jacob (to a sniper) and his second eldest son James and James' wife Anne (to deserters), Charlie and the rest of the family return home, defeated. In his despair, Charlie is reminded to return to church, where he, at long last, is reunited with Robert once more.

 Productions 
The play was first performed at the Goodspeed Opera House in East Haddam, Connecticut, during 1974. It then moved to the Colonial Theater in Boston for a pre-Broadway run from November 25, 1974 - December 14, 1974. It then transferred to the Alvin Theatre on Broadway beginning on January 7, 1975. where it played for a total of 1,050 performances, ending August 7, 1977.

The cast featured John Cullum (Charlie Anderson, the main role), Joel Higgins (James),  Penelope Milford (Jenny), Robert Rosen (Henry), Ted Agress (Jacob), Gordon Halliday (Sam), Chip Ford (Gabriel), Joseph Shapiro (Robert, the boy), David Russell (John), Jordan Suffin (Nathan), Gary Harger (Corporal), Charles Welch (Rev. Byrd), and Donna Theodore (Anne), who won a Drama Desk Award for her performance. The cast also included Betsy Beard, Tedd Carrere, Stephen Dubov, Gary Harger, Brian James, Robert Johanson, Sherry Lambert, Craig Lucas, Gene Masoner, Paul Myrvold, Dan Ormond, Casper Roos, J. Kevin Scannell, Jack Starkey, E. Allen Stevens, Marshall Thomas, Matt Gavin, Edward Penn, and Ed Preble.

The production was directed by Philip Rose, with scenery by Chuck Murawski, lighting by Thomas R. Skelton, costumes by Pearl Somner and Winn Morton, choreography by Robert Tucker, dance arrangements by Russell Warner, musical direction by Lynn Crigler, and orchestrations by Don Walker. Michael P. Price was executive director of the Goodspeed Opera House.

The production was nominated for six Tony Awards, including Best Musical, and won two: one for Best Actor in a Musical (John Cullum) and the other for Best Book of a Musical.
  Shenandoah was revived at the Virginia Theatre on Broadway, again with Cullum in the main role, on August 8, 1989, and ended September 2, 1989. It returned to the Goodspeed Opera House during 1994, featuring Marc Kudisch. A new production began on March 22, 2006 at Ford's Theatre in Washington, D.C., featuring Scott Bakula. A positive critical response and strong sales resulted in the run being extended through May 21, although Bakula left the production April 30.Shenandoah'' was staged by The Serenbe Playhouse in Serenbe, Georgia the spring of 2019. It featured Taylor Hicks and Rachel Potter in the cast. It was received with good reviews.

Characters 

Characters
 Charlie Anderson
 Anne
 James Anderson
 Jenny Anderson
 Jacob Anderson
 Nathan Anderson
 John Anderson
 Sam
 Gabriel
 Robert Anderson
 Henry
 Corporal
 Sergeant Johnson
 Reverend Byrd
 Mr. Carol
 Tinkham

Musical numbers

Act I
 Raise the Flag of Dixie (Prologue) - Ensemble
 I've Heard it All Before - Charlie
 Pass the Cross to Me - Ensemble
 Why Am I Me? - The Boy and Gabriel
 Next to Lovin' (I Like Fightin')  - Jacob, James, Nathan, John and Henry
 Over the Hill - Jenny
 The Pickers are Coming - Charlie
 Next to Lovin' (I Like Fightin') (Reprise) - Jacob, James, Nathan, John, Henry and Jenny
 Meditation - Charlie
 We Make a Beautiful Pair - Anne and Jenny
 Violets and Silverbells - Jenny, Sam and Ensemble
 It's a Boy! - Charlie, Jacob, James, Nathan, John and Henry

Act II
 Entr'acte - Orchestra
 Freedom - Anne and Gabriel
 Violets and Silverbells (reprise) - James and Anne
 Papa's Gonna Make it Alright - Charlie
 The Only Home I Know - Corporal and Ensemble
 The Only Home I Know (Reprise) - Corporal
 Papa's Gonna Make it Alright (Reprise) - Jenny
 Meditation II - Charlie
 Pass the Cross to Me (Finale) - Ensemble
 Freedom (curtain call) - Ensemble

References

External links
 
 Shenandoah at Ford's Theatre

1974 musicals
Broadway musicals
Musicals based on films
Tony Award-winning musicals